Mary Champion de Crespigny (née Clarke;  - 12 July 1812) was an English novelist and letter writer.

Personal life 
Mary Clarke was born , an only daughter.

She married Sir Claude Champion de Crespigny, 1st Baronet. They had one child, a son named William, born on 1 January 1765. William was educated at Eton College and Trinity Hall, Cambridge and was MP for Southampton 1818–1826.

She died at Richmond House on 12 July 1812.

Writing 
Around 1780, Mary Champion de Crespigny wrote a series of letters to her son, William, then aged 15. These were published as Letters of Advice from a Mother to her Son in 1803 and were dedicated to John Moore, the Archbishop of Canterbury.

In 1796, she published her only novel, The Pavilion, in four volumes.

She is one of the "lost" women writers listed by Dale Spender in Mothers of the Novel: 100 Good Women Writers Before Jane Austen.

References 

1740s births
1812 deaths
English letter writers
English women novelists
Women letter writers